Lincoln Vyver (born 2 March 2001) is a South African professional soccer player who plays as a goalkeeper for Cape Town Spurs and the South Africa national team.

International career
He made his debut for South Africa national soccer team on 14 July 2021 in a 2021 COSAFA Cup game against Zambia. South Africa won the tournament.

References

External links

2001 births
Living people
South African soccer players
South Africa international soccer players
Association football goalkeepers
Cape Town Spurs F.C. players
National First Division players